Hornets' Nest is an audio play in five episodes based on the long-running British science fiction television series Doctor Who. It is written by Paul Magrs, and stars Tom Baker as the Fourth Doctor and Richard Franklin as Captain Mike Yates. It was released on five CDs by BBC Audiobooks between September and December 2009, as well as on a special, individually signed, 10 black and yellow (5 black, 5 yellow) coloured LP box set edition in May 2022.  They feature multiple actors, but all five episodes contain some degree of narration by different characters.

Hornets' Nest

The Stuff of Nightmares

(released 3 September 2009)
Captain Mike Yates (retired) responds to an advert in a paper that seems to be specifically directed at him.  This leads him to a small cottage in Sussex and a meeting with his old UNIT colleague, the Doctor, who looks exactly as he did over three decades ago. Once there, the Doctor tells Yates about his recent fight against a swarm of psychic alien Hornets.  His first encounter with them involved their possession of an army of taxidermy animals.

Cast
The Doctor – Tom Baker
Captain Mike Yates – Richard Franklin
Mrs Wibbsey – Susan Jameson
Percy Noggins – Daniel Hill

The Dead Shoes

(released 8 October 2009)
The Doctor explains that he tracked the Hornets back to 1932, to a pair of ballet slippers in a shop called Cromer's Palace of Curios.  The owner, Mrs Wibbsey, shrinks the Doctor and traps him inside a possessed dollhouse.

Cast
The Doctor – Tom Baker
Captain Mike Yates – Richard Franklin
Mrs Wibbsey – Susan Jameson
Ernestina Stott – Clare Corbett
The Reverend Small – Christian Rodska

The Circus of Doom
(released 5 November 2009)
The Doctor traces the Hornets further back in time.  In 1832, a decadent circus run by a bitter dwarf entrances the simple citizens of Blandford.

Cast
The Doctor – Tom Baker
Captain Mike Yates – Richard Franklin
Sally – Susie Riddell
Dr. Adam Farrow – Michael Maloney
Old Lady – Susan Jameson
Francesca – Jilly Bond
Antonio – Stephen Thorne

A Sting in the Tale
(released 3 December 2009)
The Doctor finally finds the earliest infestation of the Hornets in the year 1039. A nunnery in Northumbria is besieged by wild dogs.  The Hornets, new to Earth, encounter the Doctor for the first time (from their perspective) and fight to find their lost queen.  This leads to a chase through the corridors and strange forgotten rooms of the TARDIS.

Cast
The Doctor – Tom Baker
Captain Mike Yates – Richard Franklin
Nun – Clare Corbett
Sister – Susie Riddell
The Swarm – Rula Lenska
Mrs Wibbsey – Susan Jameson

Hive of Horror
(released 3 December 2009)
Yates and the Doctor make their final confrontation with the queen of the hive, inside the paper skull of a stuffed zebra.

Cast
The Doctor – Tom Baker
Captain Mike Yates – Richard Franklin
Mrs Wibbsey – Susan Jameson
The Queen – Rula Lenska

Crew
Writer – Paul Magrs
Producer & Director – Kate Thomas
Script Editor & Executive Producer – Michael Stevens
Cover Illustrators – Ben Willsher and Anthony Dry

Continuity
The Doctor tells Yates about his "recent escapades", including "giant rats", "killer robots" and "skulls from the dawn of time".  As these adventures take place with Leela and because he is now alone, this story presumably takes place just after she left him at the end of The Invasion of Time.
Yates' breakdown, dark times and search for redemption were chronicled in his last few television stories, The Green Death, Invasion of the Dinosaurs  and Planet of the Spiders.
The Fourth Doctor, Yates and Mrs Wibbsey are reunited one year later in Paul Magrs' sequel, Demon Quest and again in Serpent Crest.

Cast notes
This was the first time Tom Baker reprised the role of the Doctor in an original full-length story since leaving the TV show.
Richard Franklin reprised the role of Captain Yates in The Magician's Oath, a Big Finish Productions audio story released a few months before Hornet's Nest.
Susan Jameson was also in a Big Finish Production, ten years previously.  The Spectre of Lanyon Moor featured Colin Baker as the Sixth Doctor and Nicholas Courtney as The Brigadier.
Daniel Hill appeared in Shada, the Fourth Doctor TV story that was aborted due to a strike.
Rula Lenska appeared in the Fifth Doctor TV story Resurrection of the Daleks.
Stephen Thorne played several monsters in the TV series.  He was in the Third Doctor stories The Dæmons as Azal, The Three Doctors as Omega and Frontier in Space as an Ogron.  He was also in one episode of the Fourth Doctor story The Hand of Fear as the male version of Eldrad.

Broadcast
In December 2011, these audio plays were broadcast on the digital radio station BBC Radio 4 Extra.

References

External links
 
 Press Release
 Store Site
 AudioGO Store

2009 audio plays
Fourth Doctor audio plays